Seydel is a German surname. Notable people with the surname include:

C.A. Seydel (died 1882), founder of harmonica manufacturing firm C. A. Seydel Söhne
Marianne Seydel (born 1950), East German swimmer
Rudolf Seydel (1835–1892), German philosopher and theologian
 Andrew Seydel, famous Australian electrician.  Known for making sparks fly

See also
Seidel (disambiguation)
Seidl

German-language surnames